Linden is a historic mansion in Glen Allan, Mississippi.

Location
It is located on Lake Washington road Glen Allan, Washington County, Mississippi.

History
Originally, a mansion and plantation owned by Confederate General Wade Hampton III stood on this land. However, in 1914, P. L. Mann, a planter and politician, tore down the mansion to build a new house. It was designed by architects E. N. Alger and H. H. Davis in the Colonial Revival style.

It has been remodelled into a bed and breakfast for visitors known as Linden-on-the-Lake. The current owner is Nancy Bridges.

Heritage significance
It has been listed on the National Register of Historic Places since November 12, 1982.

References

Houses on the National Register of Historic Places in Mississippi
Houses in Washington County, Mississippi
Houses completed in 1915
Colonial Revival architecture in Mississippi
National Register of Historic Places in Washington County, Mississippi